Tullis Russell Group is an employee-owned business which specializes in coating and converting a range of paper and filmic products for use in various applications.

Tullis Russell has two major manufacturing sites, Bollington, Cheshire East and Ansan, South Korea.

History
The company was founded in 1809 by Robert Tullis as R Tullis & Co. The company Coated Papers moved to Bollington in 1875. The company name changed to Tullis, Russell & Company Ltd on 21 May 1906. Sir David Russell was a former managing director. The company's brand of paper was called Ivorex, and Ivorindex for card. The company joined the Employers' Federation of Paper and Board Makers in 1947. Tullis Russell bought Coated Papers in 1989.

In 1986 the Russell family started a process whereby the ownership of the company would transfer to employees. In 1996 a management buyout purchased 70 per cent of the shares which are held today in an Employee Trust. The outstanding 30 per cent is held in the Russell Trust. In 2011 Tullis Russell received the Txemi Cantera International Social Economy Prize from ASLE for its commitment to the principles of the Social Economy.

In 1999 Tullis Russell purchased Kwang Duck Facility in Ansan, Korea and is focused on the Image Transfer market. In 2015 Tullis Russell Labelstock division began trading.

Structure
It is headquartered in Bollington in Cheshire, off the B5090, east of the A523, and on the western edge of the Peak District.

Products
 Coated paper for postage stamps
 Image Transfer
 Label Stock
 Watermarked security paper (for cheques)

See also
 Rapid Data Systems, of Hampshire, which produced plastic credit cards

References

External links
 Grace's Guide
 Britain from Above in 1927

British companies established in 1809
Companies based in Cheshire
Employee-owned companies of the United Kingdom
Manufacturing companies established in 1809
Postal system of the United Kingdom
Security printing